The Exchange Square is a main headquarters of the Bursa Malaysia (Kuala Lumpur Stock Exchange). The headquarters is located at Jalan Raja Chulan, Kuala Lumpur. This neoclassic building was officially opened on 13 July 1997 by Prime Minister, Mahathir Mohamad.

Transportation
The building is accessible within walking distance east of Masjid Jamek LRT Station and accessible via the GoKL Purple Route bus from the Pasar Seni bus hub.

Office buildings completed in 1997
Skyscraper office buildings in Kuala Lumpur
1997 establishments in Malaysia
20th-century architecture in Malaysia